The Maybach Mb.IV, originally designated Maybach HS, (only related to the Mb IVa by layout and size), was a six cylinder in-line piston engine of  output, originally developed for use in airships. It was also used for large aircraft such as the Zeppelin-Lindau Rs.I giant seaplane.

Variants of the original HS engine included the Maybach HS D and Maybach HS Lu

Variants
Maybach HSCompany designation
Maybach HS D A variant of the HS
Maybach HS Lu A high compression high altitude rated variant.
Mb.IV The Idflieg designation for production HS engines.

Applications
 Zeppelin-Lindau Rs.I
 Zeppelin-Staaken V.G.O I & II (1915)
 LVG G.III
 Siemens-Schuckert L.I
 Aero A.24
 Heinkel HE 1

References

Further reading

Airship engines
Maybach engines
1910s aircraft piston engines